Stan van den Buijs (born 8 June 1957) is a Belgian retired football player, who is most notable (or notorious) for scoring a hat-trick of own goals (three own goals) in one match while playing for Germinal Ekeren against Anderlecht in the 1994–95 season of the Belgian Jupiler League (Anderlecht won 3-2).

On 20 February 2022, New Zealand defender Meikayla Moore scored a perfect hat-trick of own goals in a match for New Zealand against the United States at the SheBelieves Cup, all in the first half. Moore is the second footballer believed to have recorded a hat-trick of own goals which were not deliberate, after van den Buys.

Personal life
His son Dario Van den Buijs plays professionally in the Netherlands.

References

1957 births
Living people
Association football defenders
Association football midfielders
Belgian footballers
Beerschot A.C. players
K. Berchem Sport players
Club Brugge KV non-playing staff
Beerschot A.C. non-playing staff
Standard Liège non-playing staff